Blackheart Records is an American record label founded by rock musicians Joan Jett and Kenny Laguna. Artists include The Eyeliners, Girl in a Coma, the Cute Lepers, the Dollyrots, The Vacancies, Fea, Jackknife Stiletto, L7, and Joan Jett & the Blackhearts.

History
Six of Jett's Top 40 hits were released on Blackheart Records.  "I Hate Myself for Loving You" from 1988 placed highest in the charts.

During most of the 1990s, while it was under distribution by Mercury/PolyGram Records, the label ventured into hip hop music and released albums by artists including Big Daddy Kane and Professor Griff.

Studio albums released

References

External links

Joan Jett and the Legend of Blackheart Records

American record labels
Punk record labels
Joan Jett